Birtvisi is a ruined medieval fortress in Kvemo Kartli, Georgia, nested within limestone cliffs in the Algeti river gorge. It is now within the boundaries of the Tetritsqaro Municipality, adjacent to the Algeti National Park, south-west of the nation's capital Tbilisi.

Ruins 

Birtvisi is essentially a natural rocky fortress of 1 km², secured by walls and towers, the most prominent of which – known as Sheupovari ("Obstinate") – tops the tallest rock in the area. Various accessory structures, an aqueduct included, have also survived.

History 
In written sources, Birtvisi is first mentioned as a possession of the Arab amir of Tiflis of which he was divested by the Georgian nobles Liparit, Duke of Kldekari and Ivane Abazasdze in 1038. In medieval Georgia, Birtvisi entertained a reputation of an impregnable stronghold whose master could control the entire strategic Algeti gorge. The Turco-Mongol amir Timur notably reduced the fortress during one of his invasions of Georgia in 1403. After the partition of the Kingdom of Georgia later in the 15th century, Birtvisi was within the borders of the Kingdom of Kartli and in possession of the princes Baratashvili. 
Birtvisi Fortress is not studied archeologically.

See also 
Birtvisi Natural Monument

References

Castles and forts in Georgia (country)
Buildings and structures in Kvemo Kartli
Ruins in Georgia (country)